Scribe Software may refer to:

 Tibco scribe, a product acquired by Tibco in 2018 formerly known as Scribe Software
 Table Top Scribe System, a hardware / software digitizing solution developed by the Internet Archive